Filth or The Filth may refer to:

Common uses
 Dirt, unclean matter
 Police officer, a pejorative in British slang

Arts, entertainment, and media

Films
 Filth (film), a 2013 film based on the novel
 Filth, an alternative title for Sauna, a 2008 horror film
 Filth: The Mary Whitehouse Story, a 2008 BBC docudrama

Literature
 Filth (novel), a 1998 novel by Irvine Welsh
 FILTH by Jingan Young, the first English language play commissioned by the Hong Kong Arts Festival

Music

Albums
 Filth (Andrew Dice Clay album), Andrew Dice Clay comedy album
 Filth (Maranatha album), 2015
 Filth (Swans album), 1983
 Filth (Venetian Snares album), 2009
 The Filth (album), a 1987 album by Sonny Black's Blues Band, or the title song

Other uses in music
 Filth (Artist), an American alternative hyperpop artist
 Filth (band), an American hardcore punk band
 The Filth, or Philip Pilf and the Filth, purported working name of English band Cardiacs
 "Filth", a 2001 song by Dir en grey
 Filth, a term used both to describe and refer to some kinds of dubstep

Other uses in arts, entertainment, and media
 The Filth (comics), a comic book series by Grant Morrison

See also
Filthy (disambiguation)